These are the results of the men's artistic team all-around competition, one of eight events for male competitors of the artistic gymnastics discipline contested in the gymnastics at the 2004 Summer Olympics in Athens. The qualification and final rounds took place on August 14 and August 16 at the Olympic Indoor Hall.

Results

Qualification

Twelve national teams composed by six gymnasts competed in the team all-around event in the artistic gymnastics qualification round on August 14.
The eight highest scoring teams advanced to the final on August 16.

Final

References
Gymnastics Results.com
FIG - Fédération Internationale de Gymnastique

Men's artistic team all-around
2004
Olympics
Men's events at the 2004 Summer Olympics